Tainui may refer to:
 Tainui, a confederation of Māori iwi (tribes) in New Zealand
 Waikato (iwi), (often referred to as "Tainui") a constituent tribe of the abovementioned confederation
 Tainui (canoe), a Māori waka (migration canoe)
 Tainui, New Zealand, a suburb of Dunedin
 Tainui (New Zealand electorate), a former parliamentary Māori electorate.
 SS Tainui, a Royal Navy cargo ship that was torpedoed in 1918